Shahbaz Bek (also Romanized as Shahbāz Bek, Shahbāz Beg, and Shahbāz Beyg) is a village in Teshkan Rural District, Chegeni District, Dowreh County, Lorestan Province, Iran. At the 2006 census, its population was 284, in 59 families.

References 

Towns and villages in Dowreh County